Worksop Priory (formally the Priory Church of Our Lady and Saint Cuthbert, Worksop) is a Church of England parish church and former priory in the town of Worksop, Nottinghamshire, part of the Diocese of Southwell and Nottingham and under the episcopal care of the Bishop of Beverley.

The church is Grade I listed by the Department for Culture, Media and Sport as a building of outstanding architectural or historic interest.

History
The initial land grant and monies to establish the Augustinian priory were made by William de Lovetot in 1103. In 1187 Philip, the Canon of Lincoln Cathedral, gave the Worksop Bestiary, an illuminated manuscript that is now at the Morgan Library & Museum in New York. During the thirteenth century, two lords of Worksop (Gerard de Furnival II and his son Thomas de Furnival) died while on crusade, Gerard on the Fifth Crusade in 1219 and Thomas on the Barons' Crusade in 1241. Thomas's brother, Gerard III, also died on this campaign, while their brother William, who had also taken part, returned home. A later rhyming history, which was on display in Worksop Priory in the late fifteenth century, claimed that Gerard III survived the Barons' Crusade and returned his brother's body for burial at the priory; however, earlier evidence indicates that this is untrue. In the 14th century the Tickhill Psalter was produced by the  prior, John de Tickhill.

The priory was dissolved on the orders of Henry VIII on 15 November 1539. The property was granted to Francis Talbot, 5th Earl of Shrewsbury on condition that the Earl should provide a glove for the right hand of the sovereign at the coronation. This tradition continues to this day.
Over time most of the former monastic buildings were plundered for their stone, but the nave of the church was saved for use as a parish church, and the early 14th century gatehouse was used as a school. Extensive restoration and enlargements of the church began in the mid-19th century and continued through the 20th century.

In mid-2017 a face was uncovered, carved into one of the Priory walls, during renovation works. The face was estimated to date back to the year 980 AD, but the wall was finished around 1260 AD. It may have been a felt stone that someone decided to decorate before it was lime-washed over.

Repairs and restorations
1760 A western gallery was erected across the nave.
1784 A gallery was erected along the north side.
1845–49 A restoration by R. Nicholson of Lincoln. The church was re-roofed, new foundations were provided to the south tower and the pillars and south aisle were pulled back to vertical.
1879 New organ by Brindley & Foster of Sheffield.
1883 Repairs to the south tower. Two bells added increasing the ring from six to eight.
1912 Gatehouse restored.
1922 Lady chapel restored by Thomas Pepper and re-dedicated.
1929 Opening up of the south transept.
1932 Building of the north transept and turret to the central tower.
1935 Blocking walls at the end of the nave were removed, creating a single space between the nave and transepts.
1974 Choir built by Laurence King. New organ by Peter Collins.

Burials
William de Lovetot
John Talbot, 3rd Earl of Shrewsbury (in the Lady chapel)

Previous clergy

Priors of Worksop
Source: 

William 1180
Stephen 1196
Henry 1200
Walter de Leirton 1233
Robert de Pikeborn 1253
John 1260
Alan de London 1279
John de Tikehill 1303
Robert de Carlton 1313
Johannes 1396
Roger de Upton
John de Laughton 1404
Carolus de Flemyng 1457
William Acworth 1463
Robert Warde 1485
Robert or Thomas Gateford 1518
Nicholas Storth 1522
Thomas Stokes 1535

Vicars of Worksop
Source: 

Alanus de London 1276
Canon Adam de Roderham 1300
Robert de Beverlac 1324
William de Hanay 1328
Richard de Trent 1358
Thomas Barneby 1405
Walter Burne
John Howe 1450
John Emlay 1452
Walter Burne
Thomas Ingill 1472
Prebendary Thomas Scott 1486
Canon John Johnson 1519
Thomas Howard 1535
John Thornley 1544
John Goodriche 1577
Richard Barnard 1601
Canon Oliver Bray 1613
William Carte MA 1615
Samuel Smyth BA 1628
Walter Barnard 1662
Samuel Buckingham MA 1673
Thomas Calton 1685
John Cook 1718
John Ward 1758
The Hon. Philip Howard 1778
Thomas Carter 1783
Thomas Stayce MA 1792
James Appleton MA 1847
Edward Hawley MA 1870
Thomas Slodden MA 1882
Canon George Jas. A. d'Arcy 1909
Jas. George Morton Howard MA 1941
Canon Ralph H Foster 1955
Canon Peter H. Boulton BA LLM 1967
Bernard Holdridge 1986
Andrew R. Wagstaff BD AKC 1994
Canon Nicolas Spicer BA 2007

Organ
The painted organ case was designed by Peter Collins, in co-operation with the architects, Laurence King and Partners, and constructed in mahogany in its main parts with pine-cored block wood panels. The case has a tonal as well as an architectural function, mixing the sound of the pipes and projecting it forwards as a blended whole. The specification was drawn up by David Butterworth and is almost identical to that of St Mary's Church, Nottingham.

The pipes, of which there are 1634, are of various materials ranging in tin content from 90% in the façade pipes to 20% for some flute stops. Copper and pine are used for  other registers. With the exception of 24 small pipes in the pedal case, all the front pipes are speaking. The reed pipes are by Giesecke of Germany; the flues by Stinkins of Holland and Peter Collins; the cymbelstern is by Laukhuff, also of Germany.

The console at the foot of the central display pipes is constructed of oak; the naturals are of hard ‘blackwood' and the accidentals are white resin topped. The manual compass is of 56 notes; the pedal compass of 30 notes.

The style of voicing and the general approach to its construction has origins in the 17th and 18th centuries, rather than the more familiar instrument to be found in England. The balance of stops is in keeping with classical registration and the ‘Werk-Prinzip' of the case is designed to project the sound into the priory building.

For the mechanism of the key and pedal action, direct connection by trackers of thin wood are used to the control valves, giving the performer control over the attack and decay of each note. The stop action is electric. There are six pistons to each department and six toe levers for the pedal department. There are also eight general pistons.

The organ was reconstructed in 1996 by Wood of Huddersfield. It was cleaned and regulated and the soundboards were reconstructed. The keys were renewed; Swell Octave 2 ft replaced with new pipework by Stinkens; Cymbelstern added; entire stop action (slider solenoids excepted) was remade
with Alan Taylor solid state; sequencer added.

Great Organ
Principal 8
Rohr Flute 8
Octave 4
Spitz Flute 4
Quint 2
Wide Octave 2
Tierce 1 3/5
Mixture III-V
Trumpet 8
Tremulant
Cymbelstern

Swell Organ
Wood Gedact 8
Spitz Gamba 8
Principal 4
Koppel Flute 4
Octave 2
Spitz Quint 1
Scharf III – V
Dulzian 16
Schalmey 8
Tremulant

Pedal Organ
Subbass 16
Octave 8
Subbass 8
Wide Octave 4
Mixture III
Sordun 32
Fagot 16
Trumpet 8

Organists

 John Hilton Turvey c. 1840
 George Walker ???? - 1854 - 1861
 Frederick Staton 1861 – 1879
 Hamilton White c. 1880 (formerly organist at St Swithun's Church, East Retford)
 Revd. J.T. Bingley c. 1887 - 1891
 Thomas Pickford 1891 – 1912 (formerly organist of Christ Church, Banbury)
 H.J. Greenfield 1912 - 1920
 John Newton 1920 - 1921 (formerly assistant organist of St Edmundsbury Cathedral)
 Stanley H Mayes 1922 - 1925
 Ellis White 1925 - 
 Cecil Victor Berry
 Percy Radford
 David Burnham
 Leslie Carrick Smith
 Michael Overbury 1999 - 2014
 Mark Rothman
 Rosemary Field 2021–present

Gallery

See also
Abbeys and priories in England
List of English abbeys, priories and friaries serving as parish churches
Grade I listed buildings in Nottinghamshire
Listed buildings in Worksop

References

Notes

Other sources
A brief history of Worksop Priory. Worksop Priory website (accessed 24 December 2005).
White, Robert (1875) Worksop, The Dukery, and Sherwood Forest. Transcription at Nicholson, AP: ''Nottinghamshire History (Accessed 24 December 2005).

External links
Official website
Diocese of Southwell and Nottingham
Pipe organ information
The Priory: its foundation and Dissolution

Church of England church buildings in Nottinghamshire
Monasteries in Nottinghamshire
Augustinian monasteries in England
1103 establishments in England
1539 disestablishments in England
Religious organizations established in the 1100s
Grade I listed buildings in Nottinghamshire
Grade I listed churches in Nottinghamshire
Christian monasteries established in the 12th century
Worksop
Anglo-Catholic church buildings in Nottinghamshire
Worksop